The Church of Saint Stephen is a historic Roman Catholic church in the Whittier neighborhood of Minneapolis in the U.S. state of Minnesota.  This neighborhood is where entrepreneurs and businessmen built their mansions in the modern-day Washburn-Fair Oaks Mansion District.  The building was built with sandstone, brick, concrete, and copper in 1889–1891.

It was listed in the National Register of Historic Places in 1991.  It is considered significant as an early and well-preserved example of a Richardsonian Romanesque/Romanesque Revival church.

History
The parish was founded in the 1880s to serve a largely Irish immigrant population. As of 2013, St. Stephen's was one of the fastest growing parishes in Minneapolis due to the influx of Latino Catholics into the Twin-cities area.

References

External links
 Church of Saint Stephen

19th-century Roman Catholic church buildings in the United States
Churches on the National Register of Historic Places in Minnesota
Churches in the Roman Catholic Archdiocese of Saint Paul and Minneapolis
National Register of Historic Places in Minneapolis
Roman Catholic churches completed in 1891
Roman Catholic churches in Minneapolis
Romanesque Revival church buildings in Minnesota

zh:圣斯德望堂 (明尼阿波利斯)